Haakenbreen is a glacier in Oscar II Land at Spitsbergen, Svalbard. It is situated in the mountain group of Mathiesenfjella. The glacier is named after Norwegian businessman Haaken L. Mathiesen.

References

Glaciers of Spitsbergen